The Blackwood Brothers are an American southern gospel quartet. Pioneers of the Christian music industry, they are 8-time Grammy Award winners in addition to winning 7 Gospel Music Association Dove Awards. They are also members of the Memphis Music Hall of Fame, Gospel Music Hall of Fame, the Southern Gospel Museum and Hall of Fame.

Group beginnings
The Blackwood Brothers Quartet were formed in 1934 in the midst of the Great Depression when preacher Roy Blackwood (1900–71) moved his family back home to Choctaw County, Mississippi. His brothers, Doyle Blackwood (1911–74) and 15-year-old James Blackwood (1919–2002), already had some experience singing with Vardaman Ray and Gene Catledge. After adding Roy's 13-year-old son, R.W. Blackwood (1921–54), to sing baritone, the brothers began to travel and sing locally. By 1940, they were affiliated with the Stamps-Baxter Music Company to sell songbooks and were appearing on 50,000-watt radio station KMA (AM) in Shenandoah, Iowa. Doyle left in 1942 and was replaced by Don Smith. After Doyle left, The Quartet relocated to Memphis, Tennessee in 1950. The move proved to be successful for the group as they began to appear on television station WMCT in coming years. In 1952 they signed a major recording contract with RCA Victor. After the move to Memphis, Roy left and was replaced with Calvin Newton, who was replaced with Cat Freeman, and after Freeman left, Alden Toney was hired to sing tenor. In 1951, Alden Toney and Don Smith left and were replaced with Dan Huskey and Bill Lyles. In 1952, Dan Huskey left and was replaced by Bill Shaw. On June 14, 1954, the Blackwood Brothers lineup of Bill Shaw (tenor), James Blackwood (lead), R.W. Blackwood (baritone), Bill Lyles (bass), and Jackie Marshall (piano), won the Arthur Godfrey's Talent Scouts competition on national television with their rendition of "Have You Talked To The Man Upstairs?" The win propelled them into the national spotlight and beyond just the Southern United States.

Clanton, Alabama plane crash
After winning on Talent Scouts, the group began flying to shows with their own private plane due to the demand of their performances. However, on June 30, 1954, the group was scheduled to perform with The Statesmen Quartet in Clanton, Alabama during a town festival. Prior to the start of their show; R.W. Blackwood, Bill Lyles, and Johnny Ogburn, a local friend of the Blackwood Brothers decided to take a quick ride on the plane around dusk. Tenor singer Bill Shaw recalled the event saying; "It was about dusk, and they were going to take off, and it was unlit, and the plane went out its usual way, but then seemed like it got caught in the upward position and could not pull out, and then just fell to the ground and killed everyone on board." Members of The Statesmen Quartet also witnessed it and provided aid to the survivors, taking them back to Memphis that night. After a funeral that was attended by thousands in Memphis, including a young Elvis Presley, the survivors, James Blackwood, Bill Shaw, and Jackie Marshall decided to press on. R.W.'s younger brother Cecil Blackwood (1934–2000) took over as baritone and former Sunshine Boys Quartet J. D. Sumner replaced Bill Lyles at the bass position. According to Ken Berryhill, their producer, it was at about this point in their career that they first crossed paths with the young Elvis Presley, with whom they became friends. In the following years, the group was the first to customize a bus to make travel spacious and comfortable for entertainers, thereby inventing the customized "Tour Bus". Presley saw the bus and had one made for himself.

Group pinnacle
After the crash, the group went to work forming the Gospel Music Association and also was partially responsible for the creation of the National Quartet Convention. Sumner also contributed to the group as a songwriter, sometimes writing all the songs for a music album. The Blackwood Brothers were also setting new standards in the studio. Their RCA Victor recordings from this time period are now considered prized collectors' items. The lineup with Bill Shaw, James, Cecil, and J.D. Sumner (who for many years was unchallenged as the Guinness World Record holder for having the lowest human voice on record, and was only superseded after Guinness started accepting vocal fry as part of the vocal range) is considered the classic version of the Blackwood Brothers Quartet, with Jackie Marshall or Wally Varner on piano. A replica of the bus can be seen at the Southern Gospel Museum and Hall of Fame at Dollywood in Pigeon Forge, Tennessee

Business ventures
The Blackwood Brothers formed a partnership with the Statesmen Quartet to tour as a team in the 1950s, and they were the dominant act on the southern gospel circuit during this time. This dominance lasted for about a decade until the rise of gospel television shows in the late 1960s began to give competing groups wider exposure. The "Stateswood" team also started independent record label Skylite Records. At one time, the Skyline roster included The Blackwood Brothers, J.D. Sumner and the Stamps Quartet, Jake Hess and the Imperials, the Speer Family, the Florida Boys, the Couriers Quartet, The Kingsmen Quartet, the Calvarymen Quartet, the Calvary Quartet, the Kingdom Heirs Quartet, the Statesmen Quartet, the Prophets Quartet, the Oak Ridge Boys, the Jordanaires, the Southerners Quartet, and the Rebels Quartet.

Mainstream success
In 1966, the Blackwoods teamed up with Porter Wagoner to record a country influenced gospel album called Grand Old Gospel. It won a Grammy Award for Best Sacred Performance (Musical) and was the first of three albums the Blackwoods recorded with Wagoner. 1967's More Grand Old Gospel won a Grammy for Best Gospel Performance, along with 1969's In Gospel Country. Wagoner performed with the Blackwoods for years and were guests at the Ryman Auditorium multiple times. In 1969, James Blackwood's oldest son, James "Jimmy" Blackwood, Jr., took over as the main lead singer for the group. Jimmy had been a member of the Junior Blackwood Brothers and the Stamps Quartet. They won another Grammy in 1973 for their project L-O-V-E on the RCA Camden label and then again in 1974 for Release Me From My Sin. The group had 5-7 members at any given time with James Sr. and James Jr. sharing the lead, Bill Shaw and Cecil Blackwood on tenor and baritone, respectively, and John Hall and Conley "London" Parris taking over bass. The 1970s and 1980s lineup with Pat Hoffmaster, Jimmy Blackwood, Cecil Blackwood, Ken Turner and Tommy Fairchild had the Blackwood Brothers' biggest hit with "Learning To Lean". At the 22nd Annual Grammy Awards in 1980 they won another Grammy for Lift Up the Name of Jesus in the Grammy Award for Best Gospel Performance, Traditional category.

1980s
James Blackwood left the group in 1980 to form the Masters V quartet along with former Blackwood member J. D. Sumner and former Statesmen singers Jake Hess, Rosie Rozell, and Hovie Lister. The group continued and as did their commercial success. At the 23rd Annual Grammy Awards in 1981 We Come To Worship won a Grammy for best traditional gospel recording. It was produced by Cecil Blackwood's son, Mark Blackwood, and incorporated more contemporary sounds to the traditional Blackwood Quartet. At the 25th Annual Grammy Awards in 1983 Im Following You won the group's 8th and final Grammy for best traditional gospel recording. Much like We Come To Worship, it blended elements of newer praise with the traditional southern gospel sound.

2000s 
Cecil Blackwood died in November 2000, and James Blackwood in effect retired the Blackwood Brothers name. Mark Blackwood continued the heritage in grand style with "Mark Blackwood and the Blackwood Gospel Quartet," eventually hiring tenor Wayne Little and bass singer Randy Byrd. In late 2004, Jimmy Blackwood joined Mark, and together they resurrected the Blackwood Brothers.

However, Mark Blackwood left in 2005, reforming his Blackwood Gospel Quartet, and was replaced with Brad White. Jimmy Blackwood, Wayne Little, Brad White, and Randy Byrd remained as the Blackwood Brothers, and appeared on the Gaither Homecoming video Rock of Ages (2008). Soon after that performance, White left and was replaced with Jimmy's younger brother, Billy Blackwood. In 2012, Byrd was replaced with Butch Owens. Also in 2012, Jimmy Blackwood retired and was replaced by Michael Helwig. In 2017, Helwig stepped down as lead singer due to a battle with ALS and was replaced by Jonathan Mattingly.

In 2020, the Blackwood Brothers decided to reduce their touring schedule, and as a result Butch Owens left the group and was replaced at bass by Eric Walker. On January 1, 2022, it was announced that tenor Wayne Little had passed away due to complications from COVID-19.

On January 22, 2023, they performed at the memorial service of Lisa Marie Presley.

Commercial success
The Blackwood Brothers have recorded over 200 albums and sold over 50 million records. They have won eight Grammy Awards, four Dove Awards, and have been inducted into the Grammy Hall of Fame, the Gospel Music Association (GMA) Hall Of Fame, the Southern Gospel Music Association (SGMA) Museum and Hall of Fame, the Memphis Music Hall of Fame.

Spinoff groups
In the latter part of his life and career, James Blackwood formed The James Blackwood Quartet along with Ken Turner at bass, Larry Ford at tenor, and Jimmy Blackwood at baritone. The group performed a short while before folding in the late 1990s. Then, Ron Blackwood, the oldest son of R. W. Blackwood, who was one of the original members of the Blackwood Brothers Quartet and who was killed in the 1954 plane crash, formed The Blackwood Quartet. He eventually merged with Mark Blackwood to form the current Quartet.

Cultural influence and notable appearances
The Blackwood Brothers appeal has reached across the musical spectrum for generations. Elvis Presley named the Blackwood Brothers as his favorite gospel quartet growing up and knew the Blackwood Family personally, often inviting them to his Graceland home just to talk and fellowship even at the height of his popularity. He shared a stage with them in 1955 while on tour for the first time in Texas and refused to sing rock and roll out of respect for, and a desire to sing with his idols. Johnny Cash formed a strong relationship with the Blackwoods and the two acts performed with each other numerous times. Their song "I Was There When It Happened" can be heard singing on the radio towards the beginning of the movie Walk the Line (2005)—when Johnny Cash (played by Joaquin Phoenix) was in Memphis. In the film and according to Cash's autobiography, while auditioning to earn a spot on the Sun Records label in his early career, Cash performed gospel songs that the Blackwoods sang with regularity. They also appeared on The Johnny Cash Show and performed in 1971. At the end of the 2008 biopic film W., the Blackwood's rendition of "Winging My Way Back Home" was played. Currently, The Blackwood Quartet has been a frequent act with Willie Nelson and his Farmaid musical festival, usually closing out the festival with a rendition of "I'll Fly Away." Ron Blackwood recently negotiated with Willie Nelson to record a Gospel Album with Mark Blackwood and The Blackwood Quartet to be released on Sony Records in late 2017. Ron has been in serious discussions with regards to recording an album with the Blackwood Quartet and Bob Dylan. Dylan spoke about the record at the 57th Annual Grammy Awards when he was named MusiCares Person of the Year in 2015 and in his speech expressed his desire to make another gospel album and the desire to sing the traditional gospel song "Stand By Me" on that album. On January 20, 2023,  the Blackwood Brothers announced that, just as it had been the case when Gladys Presley died, in 1958 as well as when Elvis Presley died, in 1977,  that they had been invited by the Presley family to sing at Lisa Marie Presley's  Public Memorial Services,  to be held at the Graceland lawn on January 22, 2023.

Members (past and present)

Line-ups

Below are some of the members:

Bass
Doyle Blackwood (1934–1942)
Don Smith (1942–1947)
Bill Lyles (1946/1947–1954)
J. D. Sumner (1954–1965)
John Hall (1965–1968)
London Parris (1968–1971)
Ken Turner (1971–1988)
Cecil Stringer (1988–1990)
Jeff McMahon (1990–1992)
Eric Winston (1992–2000)
Randy Byrd (2004–2012)
Butch Owens (2012–2020)
Eric Walker (2020–Present)

Baritone
R.W. Blackwood (1934–1954)
Hilton Griswold (1944–1946/1947)
Cecil Stamps Blackwood (1954–2000)
Mark Blackwood (2004–2005)
Brad White (2005–2009)
Billy Blackwood (2009–Present)

Lead
James Blackwood (1934–1981)
Winston Blackwood (1983–1987)
Mark Blackwood (1987–1996)
Tony Peace (1997)
Mike LoPrinzi (1997–1999)
Rick Price (1999–2000)
Jimmy Blackwood (1969–83, 2004–2012, 2016)
Michael Helwig (2012–2017)
Jonathan Mattingly (2017–Present)

Tenor
Roy Blackwood (1934–1948)
Calvin Newton (1948)
Cat Freeman (1948–1949)
Alden Toney (1949–1951)
Dan Huskey (1951–1952)
Bill Shaw (1952–1973)
Pat Hoffmaster (1973–1979, 1981–1983)
John Cox (1979–1981)
Robert Crawford (1983–1984)
Rick Price (1984–1985)
Jerry Trammell (1986–1987)
Terry Edwards (1987-1988)
Mike LoPrinzi (1988–1989)
Darren Krauter (1990-1991)
Steve Warren (1993–1994)
Paul Acree (1994–1997)
Tracy Trent (1997–1998)
Steve Warren (1998–2000)
Wayne Little (2004–2021)

Piano
Joe Roper (1938–1939)
Wallace Milligan (1939)
Marion Snider (1939–1940)
Hilton Griswold (1940–1950)
Jackie Marshall (1950–1959)
Wally Varner (1959–1964)
Whitey Gleason (1964–1966)
Dave Weston (1966–1968)
Peter Kaups (1968–1970)
Tony Brown (1970–1971)
Tommy Fairchild (1971–1983)
Jeff Stice (1983–1985)
Brad White (2004–2009)
Mike Hammontree (2009–2012)

Discography

Awards

Grammy Awards
9th Annual Grammy Awards: Best Sacred Performance (Musical) – Grand Old Gospel (with Porter Wagoner)
10th Annual Grammy Awards: Best Gospel Performance – More Grand Old Gospel (with Porter Wagoner)
12th Annual Grammy Awards: Best Gospel Performance – In Gospel Country (with Porter Wagoner)
15th Annual Grammy Awards: Best Gospel Performance (Other Than Soul Gospel) – L-O-V-E
16th Annual Grammy Awards: Best Gospel Performance (Other Than Soul Gospel) – Release Me (From My Sin)
22nd Annual Grammy Awards: Best Gospel Performance, Traditional – Lift Up The Name Of Jesus
23rd Annual Grammy Awards: Best Gospel Performance, Traditional – We Come To Worship
25th Annual Grammy Awards: Best Gospel Performance, Traditional – I'm Following You

GMA Dove Awards
1970: Album of the Year – Fill My Cup, Lord
1971: Album of the Year – My God and I(Nullified due to ballot stuffing)
1973: Male Group of the Year
1974: Male Group of the Year
1974: Associate Membership Award
1976: Associate Membership Award
1977: Associate Membership Award

References

External links

American gospel musical groups
Family musical groups
Gospel quartets
Grammy Award winners
Musical groups established in 1934
Musical groups from Tennessee
RCA Victor artists
Southern gospel performers
1934 establishments in Mississippi